Mugulu may refer to:
Ggulu, character in Gandan creation myth
Yujiulü Mugulü, first leader of the Rourans